Orchard Supply Hardware (OSH) was an American retailer of home improvement and gardening products. Headquartered in San Jose, California, Orchard Supply Hardware had dozens of locations throughout California, with expansions into Oregon and Florida.

After starting as a non-profit cooperative in 1931, the company later converted into a for-profit corporation before it was bought and sold by a number of different corporations during the 1980s. In 1996, the company was acquired by Sears. After a brief period as a public company in 2012–13, the company filed for a Chapter 11 reorganization. In 2013, the bulk of OSH's assets and locations were purchased by the home improvement store chain, Lowe's.  For the next five years, the chain was operated as a subsidiary of Lowe's and used for strategic expansion of retail operations. All stores were closed in November 2018.

In January 2020, the Memphis-based Central Network Retail Group purchased the OSH brand from Lowe's.

History

Orchard Supply was formed in 1931 as the Orchard Supply Farmers Co-op by 30 farmers, consisting mostly of orchardists and fruit tree ranchers who banded together to form a cooperative to buy essential farm supplies. Each farmer put up $30 and in the midst of the Great Depression a new company was formed. Stanley B. Smith served as the company's first general manager and president.

Operations started in a rented warehouse at 230 Bassett St. in San Jose, CA. In spite of the Great Depression, the cooperative was successful. In 1933 the co-op moved to a larger location at 44 Vine St. in San Jose. The new location featured a large retail display area, off-street parking, and an adjoining warehouse.

In 1946 the company moved to a site at 720 West San Carlos St. in San Jose. By then, there were almost 2000 members. In 1962, Albert B. Smith (Stanley's son) became president, expanding the business into a chain of stores which, at  each, were considered large at the time.

By 1950 the electronics industry began booming in the Santa Clara Valley, and with it came an abundance of new home owners in the San Francisco Bay Area. The orchards gradually became residential neighborhoods, and the "Orchard Supply Farmers Co-op" became a for-profit corporation, "Orchard Supply Hardware" retail stores.

In 1977, the company purchased a 19-acre warehouse and office complex from Sunsweet Growers to serve as a distribution center. In the 1980s, Loren S. Smith (another son of Stanley) became President and continued the expansion. In 1992 the distribution center was moved to Tracy, CA.

On August 22, 2018, Lowe's publicly announced that Orchard Supply Hardware would be closed down nationwide, and would begin liquidation. It said stores would be closed by the following February, and all had been closed by November.

In 2019, Central Network Retail Group (CNRG) purchased leases to 7 former OSH locations in the San Francisco Bay Area. These new stores were to be called "Outdoor Supply Hardware", and kept a similar appearance and experience as the old OSH stores. By 2020, the chain expanded to 11 locations.

Operations

Mergers and acquisitions
Orchard Supply Hardware ceased to be a privately owned company when it and its seven stores were acquired by W.R. Grace and Company in 1979. W.R. Grace operated the company seven years before it sold the company along with another hardware chain to the Wickes Companies in 1986. Wickes operated the company for three years before selling the company to its managers in 1989.

OSH was purchased by Sears in 1996 after seven years of independence. In 2005, Sears sold a 19.9% interest in the company to Ares Management of Los Angeles for US$58.7 million, announcing expansion plans at the time. Ares had the option to later purchase another 30.2% stake in the company for US$126.8 million, but did not exercise this right. OSH had eighty-four stores at the time.

At roughly the same time, Sears Holdings announced that its Sears, Roebuck & Co. subsidiary expected to receive a dividend from OSH of about US$450 million. In connection with the initial investment, OSH was expected to issue US$405 million in debt. This debt was later cited as one of the primary reasons for its 2013 Chapter 11 filing.

Later several of the Southern California locations of the bankrupt Builders Emporium chain of hardware stores were purchased in preparation of expansion into that region. OSH was spun out of Sears Holdings in 2012 and became a public company. In January 2012 shares began trading on the Nasdaq stock market.

Expansion
In April 2013, OSH expanded beyond California, opening stores in the suburban Portland metropolitan area of Oregon. In November 2014, the company opened its first location in the city of San Francisco. The North Beach store located at 2598 Taylor St. was a former Petco and had a planned June 2015 opening. The store represented a new strategy for Lowe's to enter urban regions and markets using the OSH brand. This was following the opening of a store in the population dense Mid-Wilshire district of Los Angeles.

Reorganization
On June 17, 2013, Orchard Supply Hardware announced it filed for Chapter 11 under the U.S. bankruptcy code and that most of its assets would be sold to the Lowe's Home Improvement chain for $205M in cash. Lowe's agreed to acquire no fewer than sixty of the (at the time) ninety-one Orchard Supply stores, operating them separately from Lowe's. At the close of the process, Orchard Supply remained a separate brand and operating entity from the Lowe's chain.

In August 2013, preparations were made to close seventeen of the ninety-nine stores. Two of the stores were closed in June as a part of normal operations. This left seventy of the pre-Chapter 11 announcement stores still in operation. According to a company spokesperson, workers at the stores that closed were not eligible for severance pay due to the bankruptcy proceeding, but Orchard Supply is "providing incentive bonuses to key employees." Lowe's also committed to investing US$200 million in OSH over the next five years.

In 2016, Lowe's announced the expansion of the Orchard brand to South Florida.

Technology
Via a technology program launched initially by Lowe's in 2014, OSH announced a pilot program using "robot employees" at their San Jose store at 377 Royal Ave. The devices, called OSHbots, were supplied by a Mountain View company called Fellow Robots. The OSHbots resembled white columns with two large LCD screens and were equipped with 3D cameras, so they could identify items brought in by customers, and had wheels on either side that helped them move. Customers could research items on the screens and then the robot could lead them to the aisle where an item was located. The robots spoke English and Spanish and were connected to an inventory database so they could inform customers if an item was out of stock.

The robots were the result of a process that Lowe's uses for new developments. According to Lowe's Innovation Labs director Kyle Nel, "What we actually do is use a process called science fiction prototyping, where we give all our marketing research and trend data to professional published science fiction writers". The OSHbots were not meant to replace humans, but Nel also stated, "We have amazing [OSH] store associates, but... they probably don't know the real time location of every single object in the store."

Marketing

Boxcar

In the early 1960s, the City of San Jose denied Al Smith permission to install a sign along Auzerais Street to promote his Orchard Supply Hardware store because a sign for the store already existed facing San Carlos Street. Undeterred, Smith bought a railroad boxcar from Southern Pacific, painted the car with the OSH logo, and placed it at the end of the spur track behind his store and alongside Auzerais Street. It remained in that spot for nearly 50 years, and was occasionally featured in OSH’s promotional material. Recognizing its historic relationship to the San Jose community, OSH donated the boxcar to the California Trolley and Railroad Corporation in 2013 for display in History Park at Kelley Park.

Calendars

Originally conceived as a marketing program, company president, Al Smith who had worked for the Southern Pacific Railroad, had a love of trains and is credited with the theme. One aspect that initially made these calendars unique was that all original paintings were commissioned as artwork for each month. The theme of these calendars has primarily been trains and railroad history, with only a few diversions, including the 1981 calendar which celebrated the Santa Clara Valley. Other images have featured landscapes, steam-powered machines, automobiles, historical drawings, produce from the Santa Clara Valley.

From 1975 until 1992, railroad artist and local politician Michael Kotowski created each painting with the exception of the 1977 and 1979 calendars. The 1977 edition was a selection of “Still Live” paintings by the Santa Cruz Art League and the 1979 edition was a series of Southwestern style paintings by Northern California artist Anthony Quartuccio, Sr. The 1982 calendar had a flight and aviation theme called “Up, Up and Away” for which Kotowski created the original artwork even though it was not train related. Kotowski did the layout design and production on the entire series under his tenure as artist.

OSH's calendars have featured the works of twenty-three different artists who have created over 450 unique pieces including railroad artists such as Kotowski, John Winfield, James R Mann, 2017 Calendar, and Ken Muramoto; Muramoto has the distinction of being the youngest artist to provide paintings for the calendar.

References

Sears Holdings
Lowe's
Hardware stores of the United States
Home improvement retailers of the United States
Retail companies based in California
Companies based in San Jose, California
Agricultural cooperatives in the United States
Former cooperatives of the United States
American companies established in 1931
American companies disestablished in 2018
Retail companies established in 1931
Retail companies disestablished in 2018
1931 establishments in California
2018 disestablishments in California
Companies formerly listed on the Nasdaq
Companies that filed for Chapter 11 bankruptcy in 2013
Agriculture companies established in 1931
Agriculture companies disestablished in 2018